59 Virginis (e Virginis, HR 5011, Gliese 504) is a G-type main-sequence star, located in constellation Virgo at approximately 57 light-years from Earth.

History of observations
59 Virginis is known to astronomers at least from 1598, when it was catalogued by Tycho Brahe in his manuscript catalogue of 1004 fixed stars. Brahe designated it as "", which means in Latin "A tiny following Vindemiatrix" (that is Epsilon Virginis), and assigned it a visual magnitude 6 (a modern value of its apparent magnitude (in band V) is 5.22). Five years later in 1603 Johann Bayer pictured it on constellation Virgo folio of his celestial atlas "Uranometria" and designated it with number 37, letter "e" (hence its Bayer designation e Virginis, or e Vir) and name "Alæ dextræ sequens", which means in Latin "Following right wing". Bayer also assigned it a visual magnitude 6.

Four hundred fifteen years later in 2013 July Kuzuhara et al. announced discovery of orbiting this star planet b. The discovery was made using 8.2-meter Subaru Telescope of Mauna Kea Observatory, Hawaii.

Age and other characteristics
The star is a young Sun-like star of spectral type G0V and effective temperature 6205 ± 20 K (not much hotter than the Sun). It is also twice brighter than the Sun, its log (L/L⊙) is 0.332 ± 0.032. Its rotation period is 3.329 days. The star exhibit a Sun-like magnetic reversal cycle with the period about 12 years.

Age of the star was estimated as 0.16 Gyr (2013), 4.5 Gyr (2015), and 2.5 Gyr (2017).

Planetary system
In 2013, the discovery of a Jovian planet, b, by direct imaging of the system was announced.  A later re-analysis suggested that it may actually be a brown dwarf.

References

External links
 

Virgo (constellation)
G-type main-sequence stars
Virginis, e
Virginis, 059
115383
064792
5011
0504
BD+10 2531
TIC objects
Planetary systems with one confirmed planet